Alex Newsome is an Australian rugby union player who plays in the backline for the French club, ASM Clermont Auvergne. He has previously played for the Western Force and the New South Wales Waratahs in Super Rugby and the Perth Spirit in the Australian National Rugby Championship. He has also represented Australia in the under 20s team.

References

External links
 

Australian rugby union players
1996 births
Living people
Rugby union centres
Rugby union wings
New South Wales Country Eagles players
Western Force players
New South Wales Waratahs players
Rugby union players from New South Wales
ASM Clermont Auvergne players